Reinner Josue Arango Mendez (born 24 March 2004) is a Venezuelan weightlifter. He won the bronze medal in the men's 67kg event at the 2022 South American Games held in Asunción, Paraguay.

He won the silver medal in his event at the 2021 Junior Pan American Games held in Colombia. He won the bronze medal in the men's 67kg Snatch event at the 2022 Bolivarian Games held in Valledupar, Colombia.

Achievements

References

External links 
 

Living people
2004 births
Venezuelan male weightlifters
South American Games bronze medalists for Venezuela
South American Games medalists in weightlifting
Competitors at the 2022 South American Games
21st-century Venezuelan people